Megachile gomphrenae is a species of bee in the family Megachilidae. It was described by Holmberg in 1886.

References

Gomphrenae
Insects described in 1886